Fern Saffron Deacon (born 1 September 1998) is an English actress. She is known for her roles as Chloe Voyle on the Channel 4 drama Ackley Bridge and Agnes on the CBBC series Hetty Feather.

Early life
Fern Saffron Deacon was born on 1 September 1998 in Hampshire, England. When she was five, her parents enrolled her in acting classes, and at the age of 11, she was accepted into Sylvia Young Theatre School.

Career
In 2011, Deacon made her professional acting debut in a stage production of Kin at the Royal Court Theatre, and later that year, she played the younger version of Electra in an adaptation of Electra at the Gate Theatre. Deacon made her television debut in "Amy's Choice", an episode of the BBC series Doctor Who. She then appeared in three episodes of the BBC supernatural drama The Secret of Crickley Hall.

In May 2017, Deacon portrayed the role of Catherine Davis in the Channel 4 docudrama The Trial: A Murder in the Family. Later that year, she began portraying the role of Chloe Voyle in the Channel 4 school drama Ackley Bridge. In the same month, she began appearing in the CBBC series Hetty Feather as Agnes, a role she portrayed until 2020. In 2018, she appeared in an episode of the BBC drama Shakespeare & Hathaway: Private Investigators as Lily Rattle.

Filmography

Radio

Stage

References

External links
 

1998 births
Living people
Actresses from Hampshire
English film actresses
English soap opera actresses
English television actresses
21st-century English actresses
Alumni of the Sylvia Young Theatre School